The Nadkarni Cup is a football competition in Mumbai, India, which was first held in 1908. From 1908-1913 it was known as Junior Rovers Cup which was contested by school and college teams of Bombay (now Mumbai), with the trophy originally provided by G.N. Nadkarni.  It is hosted by the Mumbai Football Association. The Cup was not held in 1914-1918 due to World War I but was not immediately revived after the war.

In 1925, Western India Football Association allocated Junior Rovers Cup trophy to a completely new tournament only for Indian football clubs and then the new tournament was called Nadkarni Cup. The cup is contested by MFA Elite Division and a couple of MFA Super Division clubs.

Prizes
Amounts in Indian rupee.

As updated on 6 February 2018.

Venue

Results

Notes:
1. First match abandoned at 87' (score 2-0), pitch invasion
2. Replay after two legs
3. Two legs
4. Two legs
5. Two replays after two legs
6. Played early 1985

See also
Western India Football Association
Mumbai Football Association
Mumbai Football League
Rovers Cup

References

External links
India - List of Nadkarni Cup Finals, RSSSF.com

MDFA Elite Division
Football in Mumbai
Football cup competitions in India
1908 establishments in India
Recurring sporting events established in 1908